Arzay is a former commune in the Isère department in the Auvergne-Rhône-Alpes region of south-eastern France. On 1 January 2019, it was merged into the new commune Porte-des-Bonnevaux.

The inhabitants of the commune are known as Arzayaux.

Geography
Arzay is located some 27 km east by south-east of Vienne and 25 km south of Villefontaine. Access to the commune is by the minor D51 road (Route de Beaurepaire) from Pommier-de-Beaurepaire in the south-west passing through the heart of the commune south of the village and continuing to Semons in the east. Access to the village can be by several country roads running off the D51 including the Chemin de la Grande Fontaine, the Chemin de la Croix, or the Chemin de la Diligence. The hilly part of the commune north of the village is heavily forested (part of the Forest of Bonnevaux) while the flat commune south of the village is farmland.

A band of "Étangs" - ponds or lakes - crosses the commune in the north from south-west to north-east. The Étangs within the commune are:
Étang du Grand Albert,
Étang Girand,
Étang Coquet,
Étang du Grand Massot,
Étang Girond,
Étang du Petit Massot,
Étang de Clos Gabet,
Étang de la Chapelle,
Étang Ras,
Étang Tournier.

The  flows through the south of the commune from east to west and continues south-west to eventually join the Oron at Beaurepaire. The Grande Vareze flows into the largest of the Étangs in the north - the Étang du Grand Albert.

Neighbouring communes and villages

Administration

List of Successive Mayors

Demography
In 2012 the commune had 216 inhabitants.

Sites and monuments

The Chateau d'Arzay from the 19th century (chapel)
A Bread oven in the Place Jean Chabert (next to the church)
Numerous Étangs with the Étang du Grand Albert the most well known (private access)

Church Picture Gallery

Life in the commune
A Bread Festival in the last Sunday of August

Notable people linked to the commune
The Chambaran family, gentleman glassmakers of Arzay, allied to the great Daupinois families in the 17th century.

See also
Communes of the Isère department

References

External links
Arzay on the 1750 Cassini Map

Former communes of Isère
Dauphiné